Weinan is a commonly refer to the prefecture-level city of Shaanxi Province in the People's Republic of China, the prefecturel-level city was established in 1995.

Weinan may also refer to:
Linwei District, a district of Weinan city, formerly the county-level city of Weinan (1984-1995).
Weinan Prefecture, a former prefecture of the People's Republic of China, it was upgraded into the prefecture-level city in 1995.
Weinan Town, a town in the Maiji District, Tianshui, Gangu Province, People's Republic of China.
Weinan E, a Chinese mathematician.
Wei Nan, a badminton player from Hong Kong.